Hansley Alexander Martínez García (born 3 March 1991) is a Dominican footballer who plays as a defender for local club Moca FC and the Dominican Republic national team.

International career
Martínez was part of Dominican Republic campaign at the 2014 FIFA World Cup qualifying process.

References

External links

1991 births
Living people
People from San Cristóbal Province
Association football defenders
Dominican Republic footballers
Club Barcelona Atlético players
Dominican Republic international footballers
CA San Cristóbal players
San Cristóbal FC players
Liga Dominicana de Fútbol players